Commander Sir Edward Nicholl  (17 June 1862 –  30 March 1939) was a British officer of the Royal Naval Reserve who subsequently became a Conservative Member of Parliament (MP).

Nicholl was born at Ada Terrace, Pool, Cornwall . When he was 'no more than three years of age' the family moved to Redruth. He left school at 12 and went to work as an Assistant Timekeeper at the Carn Brea Railway Works. Two years later he started an Engineering Apprenticeship with the Great Western Railway at Carn Brea. He left home at 18 to continue the apprenticeship in Swindon.

In 1889 was granted a Commission in the Royal Naval Reserve. He was knighted in 1916 for war services.

He was elected at the 1918 general election as MP for Penryn and Falmouth but did not seek re-election in 1922 general election.

He was a patron of the Cornwall County wrestling Association for many years.

In the King's Birthday Honours 1928, he was made a Knight Commander of the Order of the British Empire, for "political and public services".

Further reading 

 T. C. Wignall; The life of Commander Sir Edward Nicholl; Mills & Boon Ltd.; London, 1921

References

External links 

1862 births
1939 deaths
UK MPs 1918–1922
Conservative Party (UK) MPs for English constituencies
Members of the Parliament of the United Kingdom for Penryn and Falmouth
Politicians from Cornwall
Knights Bachelor
Knights Commander of the Order of the British Empire
Royal Navy officers of World War I
Royal Naval Reserve personnel